Diego Ângelo de Oliveira (born 17 February 1986), known as Diego Ângelo, is a Brazilian professional footballer who plays as a central defender.

Club career

Brazil
Born in Anápolis, Goiás, Diego Ângelo started his professional career in São Paulo state with Santos FC. After signing a six-month contract in July 2005, he agreed to a new one-year deal in January of the following year.

Diego Ângelo left for Ituano Futebol Clube on 1 March 2007, joining until 31 December. He played in the season's São Paulo State League, as well as in the Campeonato Brasileiro Série B; he started the opening match against Ceará Sporting Club on 12 May, and scored a goal on 10 July in a 3–1 home win against Paulista Futebol Clube.

Diego Ângelo played his last match for Ituano on 28 August 2007, a 1–1 home draw against Marília Atlético Clube, with his team ranking 20th and last.

Naval
On 30 August 2007, Diego Ângelo signed with Associação Naval 1º de Maio of Portugal. He made his competitive debut on 30 September in a 0–2 away loss to C.D. Nacional, and finished his first season with 22 matches and four goals as the Figueira da Foz team managed to retain their Primeira Liga status.

In 2009–10, Diego Ângelo played all 30 league matches for Naval, who finished in a best-ever eighth place. During that time period he also signed a pre-contract with Genoa CFC, after the Italian Serie A club agreed a fee with the Portuguese.

Genoa / Eskişehirspor
On 19 May 2010, Diego Ângelo was called up to Genoa's upcoming training camp in Tuscany. He made his debut on the same day, a 2–1 friendly against Prima Divisione side A.S. Lucchese Libertas 1905. On 12 August he was loaned to Eskişehirspor, with the Süper Lig club having an option to purchase him at the end of the campaign. 

In late May 2011, Diego Ângelo moved to the New Eskişehir Stadium on a permanent two-year contract.

References

External links

Portuguese League profile (2009–10) 

1986 births
Living people
Sportspeople from Goiás
Brazilian footballers
Association football defenders
Campeonato Brasileiro Série B players
Santos FC players
Ituano FC players
Primeira Liga players
Associação Naval 1º de Maio players
Genoa C.F.C. players
Süper Lig players
Eskişehirspor footballers
Antalyaspor footballers
Kayserispor footballers
Gençlerbirliği S.K. footballers
Brazilian expatriate footballers
Expatriate footballers in Portugal
Expatriate footballers in Turkey
Brazilian expatriate sportspeople in Portugal
Brazilian expatriate sportspeople in Turkey